Events from the year 1971 in China.

Incumbents 
 Chairman of the Chinese Communist Party – Mao Zedong
 President of the People's Republic of China – vacant
 Premier of the People's Republic of China – Zhou Enlai
 Chairman of the National People's Congress – Zhu De
 Vice President of the People's Republic of China – Soong Ching-ling and Dong Biwu
 Vice Premier of the People's Republic of China – Lin Biao (until 13 September), Deng Xiaoping (starting 13 September)

Governors  
 Governor of Anhui Province – Li Desheng
 Governor of Fujian Province – Han Xianchu
 Governor of Gansu Province – Song Ping 
 Governor of Guangdong Province – Liu Xingyuan
 Governor of Guizhou Province – Ma Li 
 Governor of Hebei Province – Li Zaihe then Liu Zihou 
 Governor of Heilongjiang Province – Pan Fusheng then Wang Jiadao
 Governor of Henan Province – Liu Jianxun   
 Governor of Hubei Province – Zeng Siyu
 Governor of Hunan Province – Hua Guofeng  
 Governor of Jiangsu Province – Xu Shiyou 
 Governor of Jiangxi Province – Cheng Shiqing then She Jide
 Governor of Jilin Province – Wang Huaixiang 
 Governor of Liaoning Province – Chen Xilian 
 Governor of Qinghai Province – Liu Xianquan
 Governor of Shaanxi Province – Li Ruishan 
 Governor of Shandong Province – Yang Dezhi (starting unknown)
 Governor of Shanxi Province – Liu Geping then Xie Zhenhua  
 Governor of Sichuan Province – Zhang Guohua 
 Governor of Yunnan Province – Zhou Xing  
 Governor of Zhejiang Province – Nan Ping

Events

March
 March 26 – Cameroon and the People's Republic of China established bilateral relations.

May
 May 26 – Austria and the People's Republic of China establish diplomatic relations.

June
 June 10 – The U.S. ends its trade embargo of China.

September
 September 13 – The Chinese Communist military leader Lin Biao dies in a plane crash in Mongolia after what appeared to be a failed coup to oust Mao. After his death, he was officially condemned as a traitor.

October
 October 25 – The United Nations General Assembly admits the People's Republic of China and expels the Republic of China (Taiwan).

November
 November 23 – The People's Republic of China takes the Republic of China's seat on the United Nations Security Council (see China and the United Nations).
Henry Kissinger secretly visits Beijing

Births
 January 26 – Li Ming, Chinese footballer and football executive
 October 29 – Ma Huateng, Chinese business magnate, founder of TenCent 
 November 12  – Chen Guangcheng, Chinese civil rights activist

Deaths
 April 29 - Li Siguang, Chinese scientist. the founder of China's geomechanics (born 1899)
 September 13 –
 Lin Biao, Vice Chairman of the Chinese Communist Party (plane crash) (born 1907)
 Lin Liguo, the son of the Chinese Communist military leader Lin Biao (born 1945)
 Ye Qun, the wife of the Chinese Communist military leader Lin Biao (born 1945)

See also 
 1971 in Chinese film

References 

 
Years of the 20th century in China
China